WNFR, broadcasting at 90.7 FM, is an Adult Contemporary Christian music and talk radio station licensed to Sandusky, Michigan. WNFR has a studio located in Port Huron along with sister station WNFA, and a 42,000 watt directional transmitter at Jeddo, near the Sanilac/St. Clair county line.

WNFR is slated to rebrand from "Wonderful News Radio" to "90.7 Hope FM" on January 13, 2014.

References
Michiguide.com - WNFR History

External links

NFR
Moody Radio affiliate stations
Radio stations established in 1994
1994 establishments in Michigan